Kokia kauaiensis, the Kauai treecotton or Kauai Kokio, is a species of flowering plant in the mallow family, Malvaceae, that is endemic to Kauai, Hawaii.

Associated plants include ahakea (Bobea spp.), koa (Acacia koa), lama (Diospyros sandwicensis), manono (Hedyotis spp.), hala pepe (Pleomele aurea), aupaka (Isodendrion spp.), papala kepau (Pisonia spp.), olopua (Nestegis sandwicensis), ōhia hā (Syzygium sandwicensis), hame (Antidesma spp.), maile (Alyxia oliviformis), ālaa (Pouteria sandwicensis), aiai (Streblus pendulinus), alahee (Psydrax odorata), uluhe (Dicranopteris linearis), aloalo (Hibiscus spp.), mēhamehame (Flueggea neowawraea), alani (Melicope spp.), palapalai lau lii (Asplenium laciniatum), oheohe (Tetraplasandra spp.), akoko (Euphorbia celastroides), nehe (Lipochaeta spp), aalii (Dodonaea viscosa), iliahi (Santalum spp.), poolā (Claoxylon sandwicense), and ōhia lehua (Metrosideros polymorpha).

It is threatened by habitat loss.

Today there are about 45 or 50 individuals remaining. At one point there was only a single tree remaining.

References

kauaiensis
Endemic flora of Hawaii
Biota of Kauai
Taxonomy articles created by Polbot